Somera viriviri is a moth of the family Notodontidae that is endemic to  Sulawesi.

References

Moths described in 2012
Notodontidae